Capnopsis is a genus of insects in the family Capniidae.

The genus was described in 1896 by Morton.

The species of this genus are found in Europe.

Species:
 Capnopsis schilleri (Rostrock, 1892)

References

Plecoptera
Plecoptera genera